is an airport bus operator in the Greater Tokyo Area of Japan. It is based at the Tokyo City Air Terminal (TCAT) in Chūō, Tokyo.

ATS operates scheduled service to and from the area's two major airports, Haneda Airport and Narita International Airport, operating over 660 buses per day to Narita and over 550 to Haneda. The company also operates scheduled service between TCAT and Tokyo Big Sight, and late-night services from Tokyo to Chiba Prefecture.

The company also operates bus charter services and on-airport transfer bus services.

References

External links

Bus companies of Japan
Transport in the Greater Tokyo Area
Haneda Airport